Benedicta Gafah (born 1 September 1992) is a Ghanaian actress and a film producer. She has been featured in both Ghallywood and Kumawood movies which includes "Mirror Girl", "Azonto Ghost" and "April Fool". She is a signee of Zylofon Media.

Filmography

Mirror Girl 
Odo Asa
April Fool
Poposipopo
Devils Voice
Azonto Ghost
Kweku Saman
Adoma
Agyanka Ba
Ewiase Ahenie
I Know My Right
Agya Koo Azonto

Awards and nominations

Philanthropy 
Benedicta started giving alms to the needy and widows of King Jesus Orphanage Home in 2014. She took it to the streets to share foodstuffs, clothes, etc. every December to the street kids. She currently runs the Gafah Foundation to help the needy.

References

1992 births
Living people
Ghanaian film actresses